Centre County Christian Academy (CCCA) is a private, independent, non-denominational Christian school located in Bellefonte, Pennsylvania.  It reported 155 students from pre-kindergarten to 12th grade in the fall of 2015. The mission statement found on their webpage is: Centre County Christian Academy's mission is to provide support to the Christian home, encouragement to the church, and a young person that is sensitive in their spirit, submissive to authority, competent in their studies, and moral in their conduct.
CCCA was founded in 1976 by a group of local pastors. The first class consisted of 13 students in kindergarten and first grade. Additional grades were added each year and the first graduating class was in 1982.

Classes are taught by fifteen staff members.  The school is part of the Keystone Christian Education Association.  High school students compete in soccer, basketball, and track with other schools in the Allegheny Christian Athletic Association.  Yearly tuition ranges from $4320 to $5427, with discounted rates available for multiple students from the same family. Many other means of financial aid are also available.

External links
Official site

Christian schools in Pennsylvania
Educational institutions established in 1976
Private high schools in Pennsylvania
Nondenominational Christian schools in the United States
Schools in Centre County, Pennsylvania
Private middle schools in Pennsylvania
Private elementary schools in Pennsylvania
1976 establishments in Pennsylvania